Once Upon a Time in Iran or Khatoon is a historical romance Iranian streaming television series directed and written by Tina Pakravan. The first episode of this series was released on Namava on August 9, 2021. The series stars Negar Javaherian, Ashkan Khatibi, Mirsaeed Molavian and Babak Hamidian.

Synopsis 
The series centers on an Iranian Army family living in the northern part of Iran whose life changed during the Anglo-Soviet invasion of Iran in 1941.

Cast

Main 
 Negar Javaherian as Khatoon Bakhtiari
 Ashkan Khatibi as Shirzad Malek
 Mirsaeed Molavian as Reza Fakhar
 Babak Hamidian as Commissar Rajabof

Recurring 
 Reza Behboudi as Dr. Bukowski
 Shabnam Moghaddami as Fakhr al-Nasa
 Shahrokh Foroutanian as Fereydoun Khan
 Mahtab Servati as Mary
 Mehran Modiri as Jahangir Roozbeh
 Mehran Ghafourian as Mosio
 Setareh Eskandari as Reyhaneh Fakhar
 Babak Karimi as Haji Zarrabi
 Roya Nonahali as Mehrbanoo
 Mohammad-Reza Sharifinia as Mir Azim
 Pantea Panahiha as Gohar
 Setareh Pesyani as Parvin
 Bizhan Emkanian as Esfandiar Bakhtiari
 Behnaz Jafari as Raana
 Banipal Shoomoon as Oorang
 Mehdi Ghorbani as Farhad
 Samaneh Moniri as Goli
 Payam Dehkordi as Nazarbeyg
 Maria Shelkunova as Helena
 Kamyar Haghi as Yan Homolka
 Aida Mahiani as Barbara Kowalski 
 Farrokh Nemati as Brigadier Aria
 Peyman Mirzaei as Nasib
 Benyamin Norouzi as Amirali
 Shrin Mohseni as Gol Khanoom
 Reza Abbasi as Gol Agha

Guest 
 Soroush Sehhat as Mr. Akhavan
 Atefeh Razavi as Ghodrat
 Pejman Bazeghi as Colonel Sangari
 Ghazal Shakeri as Fahimeh Akbar
 Bahnam Sharifi as Namjoo
 Sohrab Fatemi as Sergeant MacArthur

Advertising & Visual Identity 
 Mehdi Javadinasab as Graphic Designer
 A4 Design House as Visual Identity Design

Episodes

Reception

Awards and nominations

References

External links 
 
 
 Official Poster

Iranian television series